Robert Ewing may refer to:

Robert Ewing (mayor) (1849–1932), mayor of Nashville, Tennessee, 1915–1917
Robert Ewing (newspaper publisher) (1859–1931), American newspaper journalist and editor active in Louisiana
Robert Ewing III (1935–2007), American photographer, grandson of the newspaper publisher
Bobby Ewing, fictional character in Dallas
Bob Ewing (1873–1947), American baseball player
Robert Ewing Thomason, Texas politician
Robert Ewing (sound editor), television sound editor and producer of The Trial of the Incredible Hulk